Abdul Tashfin Rehman (born 23 June 1980) is a Pakistani-born Kenyan former cricketer. 

Rehman was born at Lahore in the Pakistani province of Punjab in June 1980. He later emigrated to Kenya, where he played club cricket for Kenya Kongonis Cricket Club. In November 2011, he toured Namibia with Kenya and played in four Twenty20 matches against the Namibia national cricket team at Windhoek, Playing as a bowler, Rehman took 5 wickets in his four matches, with best figures of 3 for 21. As a batsman, he scored 11 runs with a highest score of 6. Rehman later played club cricket for Sir Ali Muslim Club.

References

External links

1980 births
Living people
Cricketers from Lahore
Pakistani emigrants to Kenya
Kenyan cricketers